Potamon potamios is a semi-terrestrial crab occurring around the eastern Mediterranean, including many Mediterranean islands, extending as far south and west as the Sinai Peninsula.

References

External links

Potamoidea
Freshwater crustaceans of Europe
Freshwater crustaceans of Asia
Crustaceans described in 1804
Near threatened animals